The Magnolia Bowl is name given to the LSU–Ole Miss football rivalry. It is an American college football rivalry game played annually by the LSU Tigers football team of Louisiana State University (LSU)  and the Ole Miss Rebels football team of the University of Mississippi (Ole Miss). The teams compete for the Magnolia Bowl Trophy. The Tigers and the Rebels first met in 1894, and have been regular opponents in Southeastern Conference (SEC), meeting annually, without interruption, since 1945.

The rivalry was at its height during the 1950s and 1960s, when both teams were highly ranked and during which time both teams claimed a national championship. The rivalry died down from the 1970s to the 1990s, owing to Ole Miss not returning to conference or national prominence since the 1970s and because LSU has seen new rivalries emerge when the SEC split into two divisions in 1992, most notably Alabama, Arkansas, Auburn, and Florida. Even though the rivalry has not attracted the same national attention in recent years, it still stirs up passion in both Oxford and Baton Rouge.

In 2008, the student bodies of both schools elected to christen the yearly contest the "Magnolia Bowl", the magnolia flower being the state flower of both Louisiana and Mississippi, and award a trophy to the winner. Ole Miss defeated LSU 31–13 in Baton Rouge, Louisiana to become the first winner of the new trophy.

It is the second most played rivalry for both teams. The 2011 edition in Oxford was the 100th meeting between the two schools. It was also the most lopsided game in series history, as top-ranked LSU defeated Ole Miss and coach Houston Nutt 52–3. In many cases, wins have come in streaks with the longest being 8, (LSU: 1928–1937). The next longest win streak is 6, a total reached by both Ole Miss and LSU. The Tigers won from 2002 to 2007, while the Rebels were able to defeat LSU from 1952 to 1957. LSU leads the series 65–41–4, with Ole Miss having vacated one victory.

Notable games

 1959 – Cannon's Halloween Run – Late in the game between #1 LSU and #3 Ole Miss, LSU was trailing 3–0. Then Billy Cannon returned a punt 89 yards for a TD, breaking seven tackles. The Rebels then drove down the field but were stopped on the LSU 1-yard line as the game ended resulting in a 7–3 victory for LSU in Tiger Stadium. The Rebels would get revenge however in the Sugar Bowl by defeating the Tigers 21–0, and were declared national champions by several polls.
 1960 – LSU fought Ole Miss to a 6–6 tie which was the Rebels' only blemish (9–0–1) en route to a 1960 national title and were awarded the Grantland Rice Trophy by the Football Writers Association of America.
 1971 - Ole Miss defeated LSU 24–22 at Jackson in the last major college football game between two all-white squads. The Rebels and Tigers each fielded their first black varsity players the next season. 
 1972 – Jones to Davis;. "The Night The Clock Stopped" – #6 LSU survived an upset bid from unranked Ole Miss in Tiger Stadium by winning the game on a TD pass from QB Bert Jones to RB Brad Davis. Ole Miss fans say the 1972 contest featured a few seconds of free football. The Tigers trailed the Rebels 16–10 with four seconds to play and the ball on the Ole Miss ten-yard line. After a short incompletion by Jones to Jimmy LeDoux at the goal line, the game clock still showed one second remaining. The Tigers used the precious second to win the game on the "last play," 17–16. The home-clock advantage inspired a sign at the Louisiana state line reading, "You are now entering Louisiana. Set your clocks back four seconds."
 1989 – The 1989 contest in Oxford, the first visit by LSU to the Ole Miss campus since 1960, proved to have a much different flavor than most college football games. One week earlier, Rebels safety Chucky Mullins suffered a career-ending (and ultimately, fatal) injury making a tackle vs. Vanderbilt. The student body passed buckets around the stadium to a then record crowd of 42,700 at Vaught-Hemingway Stadium. In excess of $150,000 was raised for the Mullins fund. The Rebels nearly pulled off a comeback of 21 points against the 1–6 Tigers, only to have the ball intercepted in the end zone in the waning seconds, allowing LSU to hold on for a 35–30 victory.
 1997 – The Rebels upset #7 LSU 36–21 one week after the Tigers shocked the then top-ranked Florida Gators. It would spark a three-game winning streak against the Tigers, including a thrilling overtime victory in 1998 (37–31).
 2003 – Ole Miss entered the game an undefeated 6–0 in SEC conference play while LSU entered the game with only a loss to Florida. The winner of this game would represent the SEC West in the SEC Championship Game in Atlanta. If Ole Miss won, they would be the outright SEC West champion and make the SEC Championship game for the first time. If LSU won, both teams would be SEC West co-champions but LSU would go to Atlanta due to the head-to-head victory tiebreaker. LSU won the game 17–14, which was played before the then all-time record crowd to ever watch an on-campus football game in Mississippi. The Tigers then went on to win both the SEC championship in Atlanta and the BCS national championship.
 2008 – Ole Miss beat #18 LSU 31–13 in Baton Rouge to snap a six-game losing streak to LSU and to win the first Magnolia Bowl trophy.
 2009 – With 9 seconds remaining, down by 2 (25–23) on 4th and 26, LSU completed a 40-yard pass to the Ole Miss 6, and left one second on the clock. As part of a series of late-game miscues, LSU attempted to spike the ball, rather than try for a potential game-winning field goal. However, with no timeouts, they did not have enough time to execute any sort of play as time expired before LSU could even get off a snap.  Ole Miss won the game by a score of 25–23, prevailing for their first win at home against LSU since 1998.
 2013 – LSU came into Oxford ranked #6 facing an unranked Ole Miss team that had lost their last 3 games. Buoyed by 3 Zach Mettenberger interceptions, however, Ole Miss took a 17–0 lead a third of the way into the third quarter. LSU would then take advantage of numerous Ole Miss miscues and, following a blocked Andrew Ritter field goal and a 4th and long conversion, tied the game at 24 via a Mettenberger touchdown pass to wide receiver Jarvis Landry. But Ole Miss quarterback Bo Wallace would lead a drive that brought the Rebels to the LSU 24 and was highlighted by two 3rd down conversions in Ole Miss territory. Ritter redeemed himself with a 41-yard field goal with 2 seconds left, putting Ole Miss up 27–24 for good. The upset win gave Ole Miss their first victory over LSU since 2009.  Ole Miss would later vacate this win due to NCAA violations.
 2014 – Undefeated #3 Ole Miss came into Death Valley facing the 6–2 #24 LSU Tigers. Early in the game, LSU had multiple chances to put points on the board, but failed to do so, missing a 29-yard field goal and fumbling the ball on the goal line. Ole Miss struck first with a late first-quarter touchdown, but LSU's young defense did not allow Ole Miss to score another point. LSU's offense shot themselves in the foot against one of the best defenses in the country, fumbling twice and throwing two interceptions. At halftime, Ole Miss led 7-3; midway through the fourth quarter LSU was given the ball at their own 5-yard line. LSU ran the ball 12 straight times on the backs of Leonard Fournette and Kenny Hilliard, but it would be Anthony Jennings who threw a 3-yard touchdown pass to TE Logan Stokes, his first catch of his career, to take the lead 10-7. Ole Miss was given another chance to win the game. Bo Wallace converted multiple times on third and fourth down to drive Ole Miss down the field. With 9 seconds left Ole Miss had the ball on LSU's 25, and prepared to send out the kicker for a 42-yard field goal; however, due to a delay of game penalty the ball was moved to the 30. Ole Miss kept their freshman kicker on the field, but when LSU head coach Les Miles called a timeout Ole Miss sent Bo Wallace and the offense back onto the field. Instead of attempting a short pass to the sidelines, Bo Wallace threw an under-thrown ball to the end zone where it was intercepted by senior safety Ronald Martin. LSU won the game 10-7 and ended Ole Miss's undefeated season and possible shot to go to the first annual College Football Playoffs.
 2015 – Ole Miss quarterback Chad Kelly threw for 280 yards and two touchdowns as Ole Miss won the 2015 Magnolia Bowl over LSU by a commanding margin of 38–17. Having entered the game with losses to rivals Alabama and Arkansas over the previous two games, the loss marked LSU's first three-game losing streak in a season since 1999. The loss also increased chatter and rumors about LSU head coach Les Miles' job security, and Miles would be fired as LSU head coach in September 2016.
 2017 – When asked about what he remembered most about his time at Ole Miss in a press conference the week before the 2017 Magnolia Bowl, LSU head coach Ed Orgeron (who had previously been Ole Miss' head coach from 2005–2007) replied, "You know, I used to stop at the Exxon and get chicken on a stick, and it was fantastic." The comment was seen as an insult and infuriated many Ole Miss fans. In Orgeron's first time back in Oxford as LSU head coach, #24 LSU defeated Ole Miss by a score of 40–24.
 2021 – The 2021 edition of the Magnolia Bowl was of particular importance for Ole Miss due to the game featuring the jersey retirement ceremony of the Number 10, worn by Rebel legend Eli Manning at halftime. As such, the end zones featured Manning’s last name painted white with the Rebels’ signature red background. Despite the Tigers’ promising start—which included a 90 yard scoring drive on the opening possession—the twelfth-ranked Rebels’ high-scoring offense overpowered the LSU defense and jumped out to a 17–7 halftime lead thanks to a 43-yd. field goal from kicker Caden Costa and both a passing and rushing touchdown from quarterback Matt Corral. The Rebels stretched the lead to 24 by the end of the third quarter due to a pair of rushing scores courtesy of running backs Henry Parrish, Jr. and Jerrion Ealy, which effectively put the game out of reach for the Tigers. Ole Miss went on to defeat LSU 31–17, ending the Tigers’ five game winning streak in the rivalry.

Game results

See also 
 List of NCAA college football rivalry games
 List of most-played college football series in NCAA Division I

Notes

References

College football rivalries in the United States
LSU Tigers football
Ole Miss Rebels football